Celebrity Marriage is a  Romantic Nigerian Film all about love, relationship and romance. It was directed by Pascal Amanfo and produced by  Uchenna Mbunabo. It was released November 17, 2017.

Cast 

 Toyin Abraham as Rita
 Odunlade Adekola as farouq
 Jackia Appiah as Victoria
 Charity Awoke as Nkechi
 Frances Ben as Ify
 Tonto Dikeh as Stephanie
 Anthony Edet as Jude
 Osita Iheme as Lakeside
 Kanayo O. Kanayo as Mr Gabriel
 Igho Leonard as Doctor
 Sonny McDon as Lawyer
 Roselyn Ngissah as Any
 Chioma Nwosu as Felicia
 Frances odega as Emeka
 Onwualu Odmake as Bridesmaid
 Jimmy Odukoya as Lotama
 Calista Okoronkwo as Julist

Plot 
Rita an actress is in an abusive marriage with farouq, she confides in her celebrity friends who also share problems similar to hers while struggling with her career in the movie industry.

See also 
List of Nigerian actors

Shola Arikusa

Black rose (2018 film)

References 

2017 films
Nigerian romantic drama films
English-language Nigerian films